Campephaga is a genus of bird in the cuckoo-shrike family Campephagidae.

The genus contains four species:
 Black cuckooshrike (Campephaga flava)
 Petit's cuckooshrike (Campephaga petiti)
 Red-shouldered cuckooshrike (Campephaga phoenicea)
 Purple-throated cuckooshrike (Campephaga quiscalina)

The genus name is combination of two Greek words: , meaning "caterpillar" and - (from ) meaning "-eating".

References

 
Bird genera
 
Taxa named by Louis Jean Pierre Vieillot
Taxonomy articles created by Polbot